The southern little pipehorse (Idiotropiscis australe) is a species of fish in the family Syngnathidae. It is endemic to Australia. Its natural habitats are open seas, shallow seas, subtidal aquatic beds, and coral reefs. It camouflages amongst species of red algae. It is threatened by habitat loss.

References

Idiotropiscis
Vertebrates of Western Australia
Marine fish of Southern Australia
Fish described in 1921
Taxonomy articles created by Polbot
Taxa named by Edgar Ravenswood Waite
Taxobox binomials not recognized by IUCN